Niranjan Prasad Kesharwani is an Indian politician. He was elected to the Lok Sabha, the lower house of the Parliament of India, as a member of the Janata Party.

References

External links
Official biographical sketch in Parliament of India website

India MPs 1977–1979
Lok Sabha members from Madhya Pradesh
Janata Party politicians
Bharatiya Jana Sangh politicians
1930 births
Possibly living people